Durkee is an unincorporated community in Baker County, Oregon, United States.  It has a post office with the ZIP code of 97905.  Durkee lies at the Vandercar Road exit of Interstate 84. Durkee is known as the site of Oregon's only cement plant, the Ash Grove Cement Company plant in nearby Nelson. It one of Baker County's largest private employers.

Durkee was originally a stage stop called Express, and by the 1860s it was the only transfer point between Umatilla, Oregon, and Boise, Idaho. It prospered as a water stop and telegraph station for the railroad, and later as a stop on Highway 30, the only paved road in the area. The community was platted in 1908, even though the population had already peaked.

Education
In 1969 the local school had nine students.

References

External links

Unincorporated communities in Baker County, Oregon
Populated places established in the 1860s
1860s establishments in Oregon
Unincorporated communities in Oregon